The BBC Radio Scotland Young Traditional Musician competition has run annually since 2001.
It exists to encourage young musicians to keep their tradition alive and to provide performance opportunities, tools and advice to help contestants make a career in traditional music. Former winners include Hannah Rarity, Mohsen Amini, Robyn Stapleton, Shona Mooney and Emily Smith.

Competition
The competition was started in 2000 by Simon Thoumire, together with fiddler Clare McLaughlin and Elspeth Cowie, national organiser of the Traditional Music and Song Association of Scotland (TMSA), and was first awarded at the 2001 Celtic Connections festival. 
BBC Radio Scotland started to support the award the following year, and has continued to do so. The award is  organised and run by Hands Up for Trad on behalf of BBC Radio Scotland.

The usual format of the award is a residential weekend in October at Wiston Lodge, South Lanarkshire for twelve semi-finalists. From there, six are selected to go on to a final concert, where the winner is chosen by a panel of judges. 

Since 2007, the final concert has been held in Glasgow City Halls on the last day of the Celtic Connections festival, and  broadcast live on BBC Radio Scotland. Between 2012 and 2015 the final concert was also televised on BBC Alba. The presenter was initially Mary Ann Kennedy, replaced in 2016 by Bruce MacGregor. From 2020 the final concert was again televised on BBC Alba with Joy Dunlop giving Gaelic commentary alongside MacGregor.

The semi-finals of the 2021 competition took place in October 2020 during the COVID-19 pandemic. Instead of the Wiston Lodge weekend, the entrants performed in the foyer of the BBC Pacific Quay building, with no audience.

The eligibility criteria are that the contestant is aged between 16 and 27, and is normally resident in Scotland or has lived in Scotland for five years. This age range is more extended than the similarly titled BBC Radio 2 Young Folk Award. That award is open to all United Kingdom residents, but its age range is just 16 to 21. Hence the contestants for the Scottish award are usually more advanced musicians, often students or graduates of one of the degrees in traditional music such as the Royal Conservatoire of Scotland's BMus with Honours (Traditional music), and already established in a professional career in music. 

While the BBC Radio 2 Young Folk Award uses the umbrella term "folk", the BBC Radio Scotland Young Traditional Musician award is specifically for a Scottish musician performing the music of their own tradition, though not necessarily Scottish traditional music.

The TMSA Young Trad Tour is an annual tour of Scotland by the finalists and the previous year's winner, organised by the Traditional Music and Song Association of Scotland, and supported by Creative Scotland. The destinations include the Celtic Connections festival and the hometowns of each of the finalists. The musicians also make an album together.

Award winners and nominees 
Winners are listed first and marked with a blue riband.

See also
 Celtic Connections
 Music of Scotland
 Scottish folk music

Notes

References

External links

BBC Radio Scotland programmes
BBC Alba shows
Awards established in 2001
Folk music awards
Annual events in Glasgow
Music competitions in the United Kingdom
2001 establishments in Scotland
Scottish folk music
Scottish awards
Early career awards
Recurring events established in 2001
Annual events in Scotland
Young Traditional Musician